God, the Devil and Bob is an American animated sitcom which aired on NBC from March 9 to March 28, 2000, leaving nine episodes unaired. It was created by Matthew Carlson. The entire series was released on Region 1 DVD in the United States on January 4, 2005. Reruns of the series began airing on Cartoon Network's late night sister time-sharing network, Adult Swim, on January 1, 2011, with the network airing the nine remaining episodes of the series from January 8 to March 26, 2011.

Thirteen episodes were made, but only four were broadcast in the United States before the series was canceled due to a combination of low ratings and pressure from religious activists, despite receiving mostly positive reviews from critics and audiences alike.

Garner wrote in his memoirs that "It's a shame we went out of business so soon because I loved playing God."

The show, however, was well received in places such as the United Kingdom, Ireland, and Latin America (including Brazil), where BBC Two, RTÉ, and Fox, respectively, aired the entire series. It was once broadcast on the now-defunct Philippine channel Maxxx.

Synopsis
The series was based on God (voiced by James Garner) and the Devil (voiced by Alan Cumming) making a bet over the fate of the world. God wants to wipe humanity off the face of the planet and start over, but he realizes that he's "not that kind of God." The Devil gets to choose one person,  and if that person does not prove they have made the world a better place, God will destroy the world. The Devil chooses Bob Allman (voiced by French Stewart), a beer-drinking, porno-watching auto plant worker from the suburbs of Detroit who, when asked to save humanity from complete annihilation, asks "What's in it for me?" After saving humanity in the pilot episode, the series revolves around Bob being God's "Go-To Guy" whenever he gets a great idea to help out the world.

Characters
 God (voiced by James Garner) - The laid-back, beer-drinking deity, whose human appearance is visually styled on Jerry Garcia of The Grateful Dead. Though he is distressed with the state of the world and is considering destroying it and starting over, even going so far as to design a new universe where marsupials replace humanity and humanity "is somewhere down the food chain", he wants to give humanity a sporting chance. Though he and the Devil appear to have put much of their differences behind them, and are frequently seen socializing, God has a habit of constantly forgetting the devil's birthday. He often wears sunglasses and enjoys poptarts, corn nuts and spacefood sticks because of their convenience. Though he is normally invisible to everyone but Bob, children can also see him. He has guidance over people's souls until they are 12.
 The Devil (also known as Lucifer) (voiced by Alan Cumming) - The Devil is trying to persuade God to destroy the world, and is constantly trying to thwart Bob in his attempts to save it. He is a margarita drinker and drives a purple Dodge Charger described by Bob as the "coolest car [he's] ever seen". Despite appearances, the Devil is needy and co-dependent, often reduced to tears when God ignores, or forgets about, him to the point he planned to go to war with Heaven when God forgot their golf outing. He also goes into vicious rants when he loses a game (i.e. bowling with God). He has influence over people's souls from the ages of 12–20. He often observed Bob and plots ways to cause chaos but rarely does anything that is more than an inconvenience. One episode where God began acting human had him delight in being unsupervised only to quickly tire of it being “pointless” without god. He says it's like a chess game implying he only plots against God out of habit and for attention. Robert Downey Jr. was originally cast to voice the Devil, but was forced to pull out because of his relapse into drug addiction.
 Bob Allman (voiced by French Stewart) - The pornography-watching, heavy-drinking, surly under-educated prophet/messenger of God. He is an auto plant worker from Detroit, and is a huge fan of the Red Wings. Despite his numerous failings, God has faith in him and Bob eventually pulls through. He is very unsure of being qualified or capable to save the world. He clearly loves his family and goes to extreme lengths to keep them safe. However Bob often makes excuses to go drinking. As the series progresses, Bob appears to start to be on friendly terms with both God and the Devil, though the latter is still frequently antagonistic towards Bob. 
 Donna Allman (voiced by Laurie Metcalf) - Bob's wife who is constantly trying her best to be a good mother. She doesn't believe Bob's claims that he is working for God and thinks he must be delusional. She has recently returned to college after 14 years of parenting.
 Megan Allman  (voiced by Nancy Cartwright) - Bob and Donna's 13-year-old daughter and eldest child. She is overly rebellious, insistent, very stubborn, bad-tempered and unruly, yet loves her family... very deep down. She's also a bit of a hypocrite, as just after stating that their family doesn't do anything, she blows off family dinner to phone a friend.
 Andy Allman (voiced by Kath Soucie) - Bob and Donna's 6-year-old son. He is a sweet, good-natured boy who looks up to his father. He is the only person who really believes Bob talks to God and the Devil. At one point in the beginning of the show, he actually sees God.
 Smeck (voiced by Jeff Doucette) - An imp-like demon who is the Devil's put-upon henchman apprentice. In spite of the abuse he suffers at the Devil's hands, he remains loyal to his master. It is suggested in an early episode that he is among the oldest demons in hell. In episode seven, we learn the Devil would fire him were it not for his union and would kill him if he had not promised Smeck's mother on her deathbed.

Episodes

Season 1 (2000–11)

Home media
20th Century Fox has released the complete season on DVD in Region 1.  The 2-disc set features an extensive array of special features including commentaries, interviews and audition tapes.

Notes

References

External links

 God, the Devil, And Bob @ Carsey-Werner
 Carsey-Werner - God, the Devil, And Bob
 God, the Devil, And Bob  at Keyframe
 

2000s American adult animated television series
2010s American adult animated television series
2000s American sitcoms
2010s American sitcoms
2000 American television series debuts
2011 American television series endings
American adult animated comedy television series
American animated sitcoms
Animated television series about dysfunctional families
Animation controversies in television
Christianity in popular culture controversies
English-language television shows
Fiction about God
Fiction about the Devil
NBC original programming
Religious controversies in animation
Religious controversies in television
Religious controversies in the United States
Television controversies in the United States
Television series by Carsey-Werner Productions
Television series by Universal Television
Television shows set in Detroit